Pusiola sordidula is a moth in the subfamily Arctiinae. It was described by Sergius G. Kiriakoff in 1954. It is found in the Democratic Republic of the Congo and Uganda.

References

Moths described in 1954
Lithosiini
Moths of Africa